Gropiusstadt is a locality (Ortsteil) within the Berlin borough (Bezirk) of Neukölln. It was named after the architect who projected the complex: Walter Gropius.

History
Building of the quarter, initially named Britz-Buckow-Rudow and projected in a modernist style by Walter Gropius, ended in 1960. In Berlin, Gropius also projected the Sommerfeld House, the Interbau and the Großsiedlung Siemensstadt quarter. As part of West Berlin, its borders with Brandenburg (part of East Germany) were crossed by the Berlin Wall from 1961 to 1989. As of 2001 it was still an autonomous Ortsteil.

It became infamous as the place in which the German writer Christiane F. lived from childhood to adolescence, author of the novel "Wir Kinder vom Bahnhof Zoo".

Geography
Located in the south-eastern suburbs of Berlin, a short section of Gropiusstadt borders on to Schönefeld, a municipality in the Dahme-Spreewald district, Brandenburg. It also borders on to the Berlin districts of Britz, Rudow and Buckow.

Transport
Gropiusstadt is served by 4 U-Bahn stations, all located on the U7 line:  Johannisthaler Chaussee, Lipschitzallee, Wutzkyallee and Zwickauer Damm.

Photogallery

References

External links

 Gropiusstadt official website
 Info site about the Gropiusstadt

Localities of Berlin

Walter Gropius buildings
Modernist architecture in Germany